Matti Nummela (born February 23, 1955, in Orimattila) is a Finnish sport shooter. He competed in trap shooting events at the Summer Olympics in 1984, 1988, and 1992.

Olympic results

References

1955 births
Living people
Trap and double trap shooters
Finnish male sport shooters
Shooters at the 1984 Summer Olympics
Shooters at the 1988 Summer Olympics
Shooters at the 1992 Summer Olympics
Olympic shooters of Finland
People from Orimattila
Sportspeople from Päijät-Häme